Wokalek is a surname. Notable people with the surname include:

  (born 1949), German diplomat
 Johanna Wokalek (born 1975), German stage and film actress

See also
 Václav Vokolek (born 1947), Czech writer and painter

Slavic-language surnames